Krasnoyarsk-Passazhirsky (lit. Krasnoyarsk-Passenger) is the main railway station of Krasnoyarsk in Russia.

History
The first train arrived to Krasnoyarsk on 6 December 1895 at two o'clock. The first building of the railway station was built in 1895 by the architect Nikolai Solovyov.

The second station was built in 1961.

In 2003 reconstruction of the station started.

Destinations

Major Domestic Routes 
 Moscow — Vladivostok
 Novosibirsk — Vladivostok
 Moscow — Khabarovsk
 Moscow — Neryungri
 Moscow — Ulan Ude
 Adler — Krasnoyarsk
 Anapa — Krasnoyarsk
 Moscow — Krasnoyarsk
 Adler — Irkutsk
 Adler — Severobaikalsk

International

References

External links

 Train times on Yandex

Railway stations in Krasnoyarsk Krai
Krasnoyarsk
Railway stations in the Russian Empire opened in 1895
Cultural heritage monuments in Krasnoyarsk Krai
Objects of cultural heritage of Russia of regional significance